The Face of Sierra Leone or also known as Miss Universe Sierra Leone, is a national Beauty pageant in Sierra Leone that selects the winner to represent the country in the Miss Universe, one of the Big Four international beauty pageants. The pageant was established in 2016 and the foundation held in 2012 and is considered the biggest pageant in Sierra Leone.

History
The foundation of IAMSL was debuted in 2012 and launched a pageant to International competitions in 2016 by Swadu Natasha Beckley (former Miss Sierra Leone 2011). 
In 2018 the Face of Sierra Leone divided onto two national competitions which select the winner to Miss Universe and Miss Earth independently.

Purposes
The main purpose of the organization of Miss Universe Sierra Leone is to promote local tourism and to expose young Sierra Leonean women to different cultures and nationalities.

Titleholders 
The following is a list of all I Am Sierra Leone Pageant editions since 2016. In 2018 the name renamed as the Face of Sierra Leone.

Titleholders under The Face of Sierra Leone org.

Miss Universe Sierra Leone

Miss International Sierra Leone

Miss Earth Sierra Leone

Miss Supranational Sierra Leone

Mister Supranational Sierra Leone

Mister World Sierra Leone

See also

 Miss Sierra Leone

References

External links
iamsl.org

Sierra Leone
Sierra Leone
Sierra Leone
Recurring events established in 2016